White Couriers (Polish: Biali Kurierzy) was a group of around 20-30 Polish boy scouts and former soldiers of the Polish Army, most of whom had been associated with the interbellum sports club Junak Drohobycz. It existed  between October 1939 and July 1940, when it was broken by the Soviet NKVD. The task of the White Couriers was to smuggle people from Soviet-occupied southeastern part of the Second Polish Republic, to the Hungarian region of Carpathian Ruthenia and further to Budapest. The White Couriers were part of the Grey Ranks (Polish: Szare Szeregi), a wartime codename for the underground Polish Scouting Association. 

Following the Molotov-Ribbentrop Pact, eastern Poland, known as Kresy, was annexed by the Soviet Union, allied with Nazi Germany. The Soviets immediately began campaign of a large-scale mass terror, with hundreds of thousands of people deported to Siberia. The terror was mostly aimed at Polish professionals as well as their entire families.

Activities
Creation of the White Couriers was directly connected with the Soviet terror, as hundreds of people, mostly from the city of Lwow, decided to escape Soviet Union across the Soviet-Hungarian border in Eastern Carpathians, which had been established as a result of Soviet and Nazi aggression of Poland. The Couriers were mostly young men in their 20s or even teens, members of the prewar Polish Scouting Association and athletes of the Junak Drohobycz sports club. They knew the landscape very well and within 10 months they managed to smuggle an unknown number of persons. On their way back from Hungary, they took money, Polish-language newspapers published in the West as well as orders of the Government in exile. 

The group was subject to the Ewa department (an abbreviation of the word evacuation) of the Polish Embassy in Budapest and among others, was supported by Major Mieczyslaw Mlotek. The name came from a humorous dialog of Szczepcio and Tonco, popular Polish Radio Lwow characters of the Merry Lwow Wave. 

The couriers worked alone or in pairs. All had to be physically and emotionally strong, it was crucial for them to know the borderland area, guarded by the NKVD border troops. Altogether, there were up to 30 of them, only four survived World War II. Majority was captured and executed by the Soviet occupiers. One of the survivors, Tadeusz Chciuk-Celt, also known as Marek Celt, wrote a book White Couriers (Biali Kurierzy), in which he described their fate.

Known members of the White Couriers 
Note:  the list is incomplete:

 Tadeusz Chciuk-Celt (nom de guerre Zawadkowski),
 Szczepan Michalski, murdered in Soviet prison in June 1941,
 Ferdynand Freimuth,
 Rudolf Regner, murdered in Soviet prison in June 1941,
 Tadeusz Żelechowski, (nom de guerre Lopek), 
 Władysław Ossowski,
 Zbigniew Janicki,
 Zbigniew Twardy,
 Jan Hammerling,
 Jan Antoni Krasulski (nom de guerre Naganowski), a Batiar from Lwow, killed by the NKVD border troops in 1940,
 Stanisław Gerula, goalkeeper of Junak Drohobycz,
 Bronisław Lisowski,
 Helena Świątek, née Kamińska.

See also 
 Home Army
 Political repression in the Soviet Union
 Rudolf Regner
 Wladyslaw Ossowski
 Polish contribution to World War II

References 

 Celt, Marek (1986). Biali Kurierzy. Wydawnictwo LTW, Dziekanow Lesny. 
 Szatsznajder, Jan (1994). Dopisany Zyciorys... Wlawa Ossowskiego. Wyd. "W kolorach teczy", Wroclaw
 IPN: Polskie Podziemie 1939-1941. Od Wolynia do Pokucia. cz. 2, Warszawa-Kijow 2004, Wyd. Rytm, str. 1221-1319.

Military history of Poland during World War II
Poland in World War II
History of Lviv
Scouting and Guiding in Poland